Abortion in Wyoming is illegal .

After the U.S. Supreme Court overruled Roe v. Wade on June 24, 2022, in Dobbs v. Jackson Women's Health Organization, abortion ceased to be a federally protected right. Wyoming's legislature passed HB92 in the 2022 legislative session, a trigger law that would ban abortion in short order following the overturn of Roe v. Wade and took effect days after certification by the state's governor and attorney general. Under HB92, abortion is illegal except for cases of rape, incest (reported to law enforcement) and serious risk of death or "substantial and irreversible physical impairments" for the pregnant woman.

Abortion was a criminal offence in Wyoming in 1950. Less-restrictive abortion legislation was introduced in 1997 but not passed. In 2013, a fetal heartbeat bill was introduced in the Wyoming House of Representatives but never made it out of committee. In January 2017, a mandatory ultrasound law went into effect, however, it lacked an enforcement mechanism.

The number of abortion clinics in the state has been on the decline since the late 20th century, going from eight in 1982 to five in 1992 to one in 2014, and remaining at that total in 2016, 2017 and 2019.  At the same time, a few medical facilities in the state have quietly offered abortion services to women. In 2017, 140 abortions took place in the state, representing nearly 0.0% of all such procedures in the US that year. Some Wyomingites participated in Stop the Bans (#StoptheBans) rallies in May 2019 to advocate for women's right to abortion.

History 
In 2017, there were medical facilities that would perform abortions, but they did not make this information public, and women could only find out about these services if they were existing patients.

Legislative history 
In 1950, the state legislature passed a law stating that a woman who had an abortion or actively sought to have an abortion regardless of whether she went through with it was guilty of a criminal offense. It is not clear how often the law was enforced. A bill protecting women's access to abortion was introduced in 1997 but did not succeed in getting a floor vote.

A fetal heartbeat bill, HB 97, was introduced in the Wyoming House of Representatives in January 2013 by Kendell Kroeker; however, in February 2013 the bill was struck down by a house committee in a 4–5 vote. The state legislature was one of five states nationwide that tried to pass such a bill that year. On July 1, 2017, a law passed by the state legislature went into effect the prohibited the sale of fetal tissue.  Another law that went into effect that day required abortion service providers to give women seeking abortions an ultrasound, but it had no enforcement component. As of May 14, 2019, the state prohibited abortions after the fetus was viable, generally some point between week 24 and 28. This period uses a standard defined by the US Supreme Court in 1973 with the Roe v. Wade ruling.

Judicial history 
The US Supreme Court's decision in 1973's Roe v. Wade ruling meant the state could not regulate abortion in the first trimester. However, the Supreme Court overturned Roe v. Wade in Dobbs v. Jackson Women's Health Organization,  later in 2022.

Clinic history 

Between 1982 and 1992, the total number of abortion clinics in the state declined by three, going from eight to five. In 1990, family practice Emerg-A-Care opened in Jackson as urgent care so that tourists in the area would feel comfortable visiting if they needed medical treatment. Among the services they offered were abortion services.

In 2014, there officially was one abortion clinic in the state; 96% of counties in the state did not have an abortion clinic, and 96% of women in the state aged 15–44 lived in a county without an abortion clinic. In March 2016, there was only one Planned Parenthood clinic in the state. After Planned Parenthood of the Rocky Mountains switched from directly billing women to directly billing Medicaid in 2016, they ran into funding bills as Medicaid has low reimbursement rates. Consequently, they were forced to close three clinics in Colorado and Wyoming in July 2017.  The closure of the Wyoming clinic meant the state had no more Planned Parenthood clinics in the state, making Wyoming one of two states without a Planned Parenthood clinic. North Dakota, Wyoming, Mississippi, Louisiana, Kentucky, and West Virginia were the only six states as of July 21, 2017, not to have a Planned Parenthood clinic that offered abortion services. In 2017, there was still only one abortion clinic in Wyoming, but there were claims of two other providers in Jackson Hole that privately would perform abortions for existing patients. These health centers provided around one to five abortions a year. Emerg-A-Care also served women from eastern Idaho. Less than 0.5% of their practice involved providing abortion services. Of the abortions performed in 2017, 80% were medical.

In 2020, Emerg-A-Care was sold to St. John's Health.

Historical statistics 
In the period between 1972 and 1974, there were zero reported illegal abortion deaths in the state. In 1990, 50,000 women were at risk of unintended pregnancies. In 2014, 48% of adults said in a poll by the Pew Research Center that abortion should be legal in all or most cases. In 2017, the state had an infant mortality rate of 4.6 deaths per 1,000 live births. High infant mortality and lack of access to reproductive health care are closely correlated in Wyoming, as in many other states.

Financing 
In 1998, women could only receive public funds for an abortion if continuing the pregnancy put their life at risk, if the pregnancy was a result of rape that was reported within five days of it occurring, or was a result of incest. In 2010, the state had zero publicly funded abortions.

Abortion rights and anti-abortion views and activities

Dissent against restrictive laws 
Women from the state participated in rallies supporting abortion rights as part of the Stop the Bans (#StoptheBans) effort in May 2019. Wyoming Equality was one of the organizers for the Cheyenne #StoptheBans protest that drew women from across the state.

Bombing 
In 1994, a domestic terrorist responsible for attacks in multiple states bombed the Emerg-A-Care health center in Jackson during the night, causing large amounts of smoke damage that resulted in the clinic being closed for several weeks.

References 

Wyoming
Healthcare in Wyoming
Women in Wyoming